Honius, born Cornelis Henricxz Hoen ( 1440, The Hague – 1524, The Hague) was a Dutch jurist and humanist, known for his views on the Eucharist.

Perhaps under the influence of Wessel Gansfort, Honius proposed that in the phrase "hoc est corpus meum", the word "est" should be interpreted as meaning 'has the significance of'. This is unacceptable from the point of view of Catholic doctrine on transubstantiation. His views dated from before 1520, but were published later, in 1525, by Huldrych Zwingli.

Notes

Further reading
 Bart Jan Spruyt (2006), Cornelius Henrici Hoen (Honius) and his Epistle on the Eucharist (1525)
 Heiko A. Obermann, Forerunners of the Reformation (New York: Holt Rinehart & Winston, 1966), 268–278.

External links
Christian Cyclopedia
New Schaff-Herzog article

1440s births
1524 deaths
Dutch jurists
Dutch Renaissance humanists
Old University of Leuven alumni
Writers from The Hague